Madrasatu l-‘Arūsiyyah (Tamil: அரூஸிய்யா மத்ரஸா Arūsiyya Madrasa) is the oldest institution of Arabic and Islamic learning in the South Indian state of Tamil Nadu (Tamil: தமிழ்நாடு Tamizh-Nādu). It is situated in the coastal town and Islamic centre of Kilakarai (Tamil: கீழக்கரை Kīzhakkarai). It was established in 1082 AH/1671 AD by the venerated Muslim savant and saint of the Arwi region (modern-day South India and Sri Lanka), Shaikh Ṣadaqatullāh b. Sulaimān al-Qāhirī aṣ-Ṣiddiqī (1042-1115 AH/1632-1703 AD). He is known by the Arabic epithet Mādiḥu r-Rasūl (مادح الرسول). The Tamil-speaking Muslim masses and scholars of Tamil Nadu also refer to him as Appā (Tamil: அப்பா) in their discourse and literature.

Novel scheme
Prior to the inception of this seminary in Tamil Nadu, the prevalent practice in the region was for Muslim scholars to impart instruction for free in the mosques. Their students were obliged to make their own arrangements for food while accommodation was sometimes provided in the mosques.

Shaikh Ṣadaqatullāh felt that the issue of preparing food and arranging accommodation was distracting the students from fully concentrating in their studies. He thus went about to set up the facility to provide a completely free religious education by providing all the basic amenities that students required including food and accommodation.

This proved to be a successful initiative that drew the curiosity of Nawāb Ghulām Ghawth Khān Wālājah V, the ruler of the South Indian port city of Madras. He was so impressed by the results that he implemented the scheme in the Arabic College he inaugurated in Madras known as, Madrasa-e-Azam.

Extensions
The seminary was renovated in 1220AH/1805 AD by Shaikh ‘Abd al-Qādir al-Kirkari who is known by the epithet Taikā Ṣāḥib al-Kirkarī (مادح الرسول) in Arabic and Kīlakkarai Taikā Ṣāḥib (கீழக்கரை தைகா ஸாஹிப்) in Tamil.

When Shaikh Sayyid Muḥammad b. Aḥmad Lebbai, known by the epithets Imāmu l-‘Arūs (إمام العروس) in Arabic and Māppillai Lebbai ‘Ālim (மாப்பிள்ளை லெப்பை ஆலிம்) in Tamil, inherited the seminary from his father-in-law, Shaikh ‘Abd al-Qādir al-Kirkari, he renovated the library and amassed a wide collection of manuscripts.

Famous alumni
Many distinguished scholars and spiritual guides have studied and graduated from the seminary. Some of these eminent personalities include:
 Kunaggudi Mastān Ṣāḥib Sulṭān ‘Abd al-Qādir (1215-1263 AH/1800-1847 AD)
Author of over 2,000 lines of mystical poetry
 Shakhuna Pulavar ‘Abd al-Qādir Nainā (d. 1269 AH/1852 AD)
Author of 4 epics in the Arwi language
 Ammāpattinam Yūsuf (d. 1305 AH/1887 AD)
Author of Simtus Ṣibyān and other works of Hanafite jurisprudence
 Imāmu l-‘Arūs Sayyid Muḥammad (1232-1316 AH/1816-1898 AD)
The 19th century renewer from the Arwi region
 Colombo ‘Alim Ṣāḥib Sayyid Muḥammad (d. 1331 AH/1912 AD)
Author of Tuḥfatu l-Aṭfāl (Hanafite Jurisprudence) and Minḥatu l-Aṭfāl (Shafite Jurisprudence)
 Jamāliyyah Sayyid Yāsīn (1307-1386 AH/1889-1966 AD)
The polyglot who compiled the Arabic-Arwi dictionary, Qāmūsu l-‘Arabi wa l-Arwi
 Khalwat Nāyagam ‘Abd al-Qādir (1264-1331 AH/1847-1912 AD)
Author of the prose work on advanced mysticism, 'Ulūmu d-Dīn
 Jalwat Nāyagam Shah al-Ḥamīd (1271-1339 AH/1854-1920 AD)
The missionary who died in a village called Bahra in Saudi Arabia and was laid to rest at the ‘’Jannatu l-Mu’allā’’ graveyard in Makkah
 Pallākku Wali Ḥabīb Muḥammad Ṣadaqatullāh (1268-1360 AH/1851-1941 AD)
The spiritual deputy of Imāmu l-‘Arūs Sayyid Muḥammad and author of mystical odes such as Allāh Munājāt
 Shaikhu Nāyagam Ahmad ‘Abd al-Qādir (1309-1397 AH/1891-1976 AD)
The late President of the South Indian Association of Islamic Theologians (Jamā’atu l-‘Ulamā)
 Abirāmam ‘Abd al-Qādir (1287-1365 AH/1870-1945 AD)
Author of Tuḥfatu ṣ-Ṣamadiyya, a commentary on the Khulāsatu l-Alfiyyah by ‘Abdullāh b. Mālik
Thaika Shuaib (Al-Qadri As-Suharawardi Multani) is a well known Islamic scholar in western countries and middle East.
Known for his lectures on Sufi Islamic science thought and he is descendant of Sheikh Bahauddin Zakaria Multani Suhrawardi.

References

Islamic universities and colleges in India
Madrasas in Tamil Nadu
Ramanathapuram district
Educational institutions established in the 1670s
1671 establishments in India